Barry Gordon (born December 21, 1948) is an American actor and political talk show host. He was the longest-serving president of the Screen Actors Guild, having served from 1988 to 1995. He is perhaps best known as the original voice of Donatello and Bebop in the Teenage Mutant Ninja Turtles franchise.

Early life
Gordon was born in Brookline, Massachusetts, United States. His stepfather, Bob Manning, was a crooner of popular love songs in the 1940s and 1950s, most known for his rendition of Hoagy Carmichael's  "The Nearness of You".

Acting

Childhood career
Gordon began performing at age three; in his television debut, he won second place on Ted Mack's Amateur Hour singing Johnnie Ray's "Cry". At six, Gordon recorded "Nuttin' for Christmas". He was the youngest performer to hit a pre-Hot 100 Billboard chart when that song hit No. 6 in 1955. It sold over 1 million copies, and was awarded a gold disc. The next year, he charted his second and final single "Rock Around Mother Goose". In circa 1956, Bill Haley recorded a private demo recording "Six Year Olds Can Rock and Roll". He begins the recording (released in 1990) by dedicating it to Barry Gordon.

As a child actor, Gordon also appeared on The Jackie Gleason Show, The Jack Benny Program, Richard Diamond, Private Detective, The Danny Thomas Show, Alfred Hitchcock Presents and Star Time with Benny Goodman. Gordon was cast as Humberto in an episode of the sitcom Sally, starring Joan Caulfield, and as Chopper in Leave It to Beaver (episode 119: "Beaver's House Guest"). Gordon guest starred on the sitcoms The Ann Sothern Show and Dennis the Menace.

In 1962, Barry played the part of the childhood version of "Patient" in Pressure Point. At 13, Gordon began a career on Broadway as Nick in Herb Gardner's A Thousand Clowns, a role for which he earned a Tony Award nomination. He later reprised that role in the film version opposite Jason Robards and Martin Balsam in 1965. The film gave him "introducing" billing, but he had actually been in several films already, most notably his actual film debut in 1956's The Girl Can't Help It as a newspaper boy in which he uttered the line after seeing Jayne Mansfield: "If that's a girl, I don't know what my sister is."

As a teen, Gordon starred alongside Sid Caesar and Vera Miles in the 1967 comedy-horror film The Spirit Is Willing. In the 1970s, Gordon appeared in the Barney Miller spin-off Fish, starring Abe Vigoda, and from 1973 to 1974 was a regular on The New Dick Van Dyke Show. He also played a waiter in "Horror in the Heights", a 1974 episode of Kolchak: The Night Stalker. In 1976, he appeared in an episode of The Practice.

Character actor
Primarily as a character actor, Gordon became a familiar face in numerous feature films and television series. In the last two seasons of the sitcom Archie Bunker's Place, Gordon had the recurring role of Gary Rabinowitz, Archie's Jewish attorney and love interest of Barbara Lee "Billie" Bunker (played by Denise Miller). Gordon also had notable guest-starring roles on Barney Miller as an embezzler, on Fish as a social worker, on Star Trek: Deep Space Nine as a Ferengi businessman, and on Star Trek: Voyager as Ardon Broht, an alien publisher. More recently, he appeared as the Rabbi in Larry David's Curb Your Enthusiasm.

Voice work
Gordon worked extensively as a voice actor. His most notable voice roles were Donatello and Bebop in Teenage Mutant Ninja Turtles, and as Jake "Razor" Clawson in SWAT Kats: The Radical Squadron (1993). Gordon's voice was also featured in other animated series Mostly Hanna-Barbera shows such as Jabberjaw (as Clamhead), Tarzan, Lord of the Jungle, The Kid Super Power Hour with Shazam! (as Captain Marvel Jr.), Meatballs & Spaghetti (as bassist Clyde), Pac-Man (as Inky), Mighty Orbots (as Robert Simmons), Pole Position, The Jetsons, The Smurfs, The Adventures of the American Rabbit (as the titular character), Superman, Snorks (as Junior Wetworth), Gravedale High (as Reggie Moonshroud), Space Cats, A Pup Named Scooby-Doo (as Englebert Newton), Darkwing Duck (as Dr. Fossil), Tom & Jerry Kids and its spin-off Droopy, Master Detective, Batman: The Animated Series (as the Penguin's henchman Sheldrake), Aaahh!!! Real Monsters, Timon & Pumbaa, Fantastic Max, and The Pirates of Dark Water. Gordon also provided the voice of "Quicky" the Nesquik Bunny in television commercials for Nestlé.

In May 2009, Gordon played the Cocker Spaniel in the Webkinz Pet of the Month Music Video for May 2009. He  reprised the roles as the original Donatello and Bebop in three seasons of Nickelodeon's Teenage Mutant Ninja Turtles. 

On April 20, 2022, it was revealed that Gordon would reprise his role as Donatello for the video game, Teenage Mutant Ninja Turtles: Shredder's Revenge. This marks the first time that he would play Donatello for a video game and his first video game role in general.

Other pursuits

In his mid-30s, Gordon returned to school; he graduated summa cum laude as a political science major from California State University, Los Angeles and went on to Loyola Law School, receiving his J.D. in 1991.

Gordon became the longest-serving president of the Screen Actors Guild, holding the office for seven years.

In 1998, Gordon was the Democratic Party nominee for the United States Congress from the Pasadena, California area. He was defeated by Republican Party incumbent James Rogan.

In 2004, when the local Air America Radio affiliate in Los Angeles went off the air, for a then-unspecified period of time, Gordon started a live, call-in progressive political talk show on Pasadena's public-access television cable TV channel 56. It continues to be cablecast and webcast live

In 2005, Gordon hosted a weekly radio talk show heard on KRLA in Los Angeles, California.

In 2006 and early 2007, Gordon hosted Barry Gordon from Left Field, a weekly talk show broadcast throughout the 25th largest U.S. radio market—the San Bernardino/Riverside region of Southern California—on KCAA Radio in Loma Linda, California. With live streams and podcast archives, the show was notable for featuring nationally known guests, including senators, congressmen, bestselling authors, and entertainment figures.

Since 2007, Gordon has taught courses in politics and the media at the California State University, Los Angeles.

In 2008, Gordon debuted his daily Internet talk show Left Talk on BlogTalkRadio.

Personal life
Gordon married Sally Julin; the marriage ended in a divorce. He married Gail Schaper in 1993. They have two children.

Filmography

Film

The Girl Can't Help It (1956) - Barry the Paperboy
Cinderfella (1960) - Young Fella
Hands of a Stranger (1962) - Skeet
Pressure Point (1962) - Boy Patient
A Thousand Clowns (1965) - Nick Burns
The Spirit Is Willing (1967) - Steve Powell
Double-Stop (1968) - Art Student
Out of It (1969) - Paul
Love at First Bite (1979) - Flashlight Vendor
Gallavants (1984) - Edil, Bok, Gank (voices)
The Adventures of the American Rabbit (1986) - American Rabbit, Rob, Punk Jackal (voices)
Body Slam (1986) - Sheldon Brockmeister
Repairs (1987) - Lew the Studio Exex
Grüne Wüste (1999) - Alex
Losing Control (2011) - Frank

Television

The Jack Benny Program (1954–1961) - Child Jack Benny, Harry Johnson
The Danny Thomas Show (1956) - Herbie
Sally (1957) - Humberto
The Ann Sothern Show (1958) - Donald Carpenter
General Electric Theater (1959) - Etienne
Richard Diamond, Private Detective (1959) - Tommy
Start Time (1959) - Larry
Philip Marlowe (1960) - Jamie
Leave It to Beaver (1960) - Chopper Cooper
Alfred Hitchcock Presents (1960) - Aaron Gold, Ignace Kovacs
Dennis the Menace (1960) - Buzzy Hanson
Thriller (1961) - Slip-Slip
The DuPont Show with June Allyson (1961) - Pepe
Dr. Kildare (1961) - Billy Hoffman
Arrest and Trial (1963) - Bobby Randolph
Summer Playhouse (1964) - Kid
The Smothers Brothers Show (1966) - Lester
Love, American Style (1969) - Bill
The Don Rickles Show (1972) - Conrad Musk
The New Dick Van Dyke Show (1973–1974) - Dennis Whitehead
Mannix (1974) - Todd Corvin
Kolchak: The Night Stalker (1974) - Barry the Waiter
The Bob Crane Show (1975) - Gordon
Good Heavens (1976) - Harold
Jabberjaw (1976) - Clamhead (voice)
The Practice (1976) - Dr. Byron Fisk
Tarzan, Lord of the Jungle (1976–1979) - Additional voices
Fish (1977–1978) - Carlie Harrison
The Incredible Hulk (1979) - Harold Milburn
Supertrain (1979) - Billy
Barney Miller (1979–1982) - David Fingler, Stanley Fine
Three's Company (1980) - Gilbert Larwin
Mr. & Mrs. Dracula (1980) - Cousin Anton
Good Time Harry (1980) - Stan
I'm a Big Girl Now (1981) - Jerry
The Kid Super Power Hour with Shazam! (1981) - Freddy Freeman / Captain Marvel Jr. (voice)
Warp Speed (1981) - David Ingalls
Time Warp (1981) - M.U.D. (voice)
The Perfect Woman (1981) - Emo
Archie Bunker's Place (1981–1983) - Gary Rabinowitz
Christmas Comes to Pac-Land (1982) - Inky (voice)
Meatballs & Spaghetti (1982–1983) - Clyde (voice)
Pac-Man (1982–1983) - Inky (voice)
Mighty Orbots (1984) - Robert Simmons (voice)
Gallavants (1984) - Edil, Bok, Gauk (voice)
Pole Position (1984) - Additional voices
Snorks (1984–1988) - Junior Wetworth (voice)
The Jetsons (1985) - Tiny Terror, Betting Machine, Lenny Lase, Mechanic, Sneak (voices)
The Smurfs (1985) - The Gamemaster, Additional voices
Stark: Mirror Image (1986) - Lee Vogel
Throb (1987) - Josh
Teenage Mutant Ninja Turtles (1987–1996) - Donatello, Bebop, Additional voices
Superman (1988) - Additional voices
CBS Summer Playhouse (1988) - Newton Hobbs
A Family for Joe (1990) - Roger Hightower
His & Hers (1990) - Bruno Chernak
Gravedale High (1990) - Reggie Moonshroud (voice)
Darkwing Duck (1991) - Dr. Fossil (voice)
Space Cats (1991) - Incidental characters (voices)
A Pup Named Scooby-Doo (1991) - Englebert Newton (voice)
Civil Wars (1992–1993) - Mel Wittnauer
Tom & Jerry Kids (1992) - Additional voices
Star Trek: Deep Space Nine (1993) - Nava
L.A. Law (1993–1994) - Seth Shumay
Droopy, Master Detective (1993) - Additional voices
Batman: The Animated Series (1993) - Sheldrake (voice)
SWAT Kats: The Radical Squadron (1993–1994) - Razor, Jake Clawson, Evil Razor (voices)
NYPD Blue (1994–2000) - Preston Ross, Dr. Berger, Philip Fox
Empty Nest (1995) - Earl
The Pink Panther (1995) - Bongo Cereal Founder (voice)
Aaahh!!! Real Monsters (1997) - Nerdy Monster, Korbutokov (voices)
Over the Top (1997) - Marty
Caroline in the City (1998) - Rabbi Katz
Arli$$ (1999) - Doctor
The Hughleys (1999–2000) - The Judge
Star Trek: Voyager (2001) - Arden Broht
Becker (2002) - Mr. Levin
Dragnet (2003) - Alan Sperry
Curb Your Enthusiasm (2004–2005) - Rabbi
Brothers & Sisters (2011) - Rabbi
Teenage Mutant Ninja Turtles (2012–2017) - '87 Donatello, '87 Bebop (voices)
Forked Up (2015) - Mr. Goodman
NewsRap (2018–2019) - Host

Video games
Teenage Mutant Ninja Turtles: Shredder's Revenge - Donatello, Bebop
Nickelodeon Kart Racers 3: Slime Speedway - Donatello

References

External links
Barry Gordon presidents of the Screen Actors Guild
[ Barry Gordon] at the Allmusic

NewsRap with Barry Gordon Flash video archives
BarryTalk.com, Barry Gordon's website, with links to live shows and archives of his radio, cable television, and Internet talk shows

1948 births
Male actors from Massachusetts
American male child actors
American male film actors
American male television actors
American male voice actors
Living people
Presidents of the Screen Actors Guild
People from Brookline, Massachusetts
MGM Records artists
Era Records artists
Mercury Records artists
United Artists Records artists
Dunhill Records artists
ABC Records artists
Capitol Records artists
People from Greater Los Angeles
California Democrats
20th-century American male actors
20th-century American singers
American child singers
Candidates in the 1998 United States elections
20th-century American politicians
California State University, Los Angeles faculty
California State University, Los Angeles alumni
Loyola Law School alumni
Activists from California
20th-century American male singers